Troitskoye-Tatarovo is a rural locality (a selo) in Mstyora Urban Settlement, Vyaznikovsky District, Vladimir Oblast, Russia. The population was 38 as of 2010.

Geography 
Troitskoye-Tatarovo is located 30 km northwest of Vyazniki (the district's administrative centre) by road. Barskoye Tatarovo is the nearest rural locality.

References 

Rural localities in Vyaznikovsky District